Liberty is a home rule-class city in Casey County, Kentucky, in the United States. It is the seat of its county. Its population was 2,168 at the 2010 U.S. census.

History
It was founded prior to 1806 by several Revolutionary War veterans upon their military grants and named out of patriotic sentiment. In 1808, it was made the seat of Casey County owing to its central location. The post office was opened in 1814. The town was formally established by the state assembly in 1830 and incorporated in 1860.

In 2012, the Kentucky Supreme Court struck down Liberty Police using road blocks as a means for writing tickets for failure to display a city sticker. They blasted Liberty for selecting the most intrusive means possible to achieve its goal.

Geography
Liberty is located in central Casey County at  (37.321195, -84.930513), in the valley of the Green River. U.S. Route 127 passes through the city, leading north  to Danville and south  to Russell Springs.

Climate
The climate in this area is characterized by hot, humid summers and generally mild to cold winters.  According to the Köppen Climate Classification system, Liberty has a humid subtropical climate, abbreviated "Cfa" on climate maps.

Demographics

As of the census of 2000, there were 1,850 people, 875 households, and 494 families residing in the city. The racial makeup of the city was 98.16% White, 0.70% African American, 0.22% Native American, 0.05% Asian, 0.11% from other races, and 0.76% from two or more races. Hispanic or Latino of any race were 0.43% of the population.

There were 875 households, out of which 20.6% had children under the age of 18 living with them, 38.2% were married couples living together, 15.5% had a female householder with no husband present, and 43.5% were non-families. 41.1% of all households were made up of individuals, and 23.0% had someone living alone who was 65 years of age or older. The average household size was 1.98 and the average family size was 2.65.

In the city, the population was spread out, with 17.9% of the population under the age of 18, 7.7% from 18 to 24, 22.0% from 25 to 44, 24.4% from 45 to 64, and 28.0% who were 65 years of age or older. The median age was 47 years. For every 100 females, there were 76.0 males. For every 100 females age 18 and over, there were 70.9 males.

The median income for a household in the city was $18,525, and the median income for a family was $27,105. Males had a median income of $25,954 versus $18,173 for females. The per capita income for the city was $14,269. About 24.9% of families and 28.3% of the population were below the poverty line, including 37.6% of those under age 18 and 28.7% of those age 65 or over.

Education
Casey County Schools operates public schools.

Liberty has a lending library, the Casey County Public Library.

Media
The town is served by low-power community station WIHE-LP and full-power stations WKDO and WKDO-FM.

Notable people
 Tim Butler, Bassist of the Psychedelic Furs
 Carl Mays, One of the best baseball pitchers of his time, Mays played 15 seasons in Major League Baseball winning 27 games in 1921 and member of the New York Yankees first World Series championship team in 1923
 William N. Sweeney, congressman from Kentucky 
 Wallace Wilkinson, governor of Kentucky

References

External links

 City of Liberty official website

Cities in Casey County, Kentucky
Cities in Kentucky
County seats in Kentucky
1860 establishments in Kentucky